Speed limits in Thailand are a set of maximum speeds applicable on any road in Thailand. Heavier cars, buses and trailer have more restrictive limits. Despite having the general maximum speed limits, the limits may be altered by a roadside sign.

Like any other countries, drivers who violate the speed limit may be liable to a punishment. Currently the offender could be fined up to ฿1,000. Despite this, an amount on the ticket is set at ฿500.

In addition to road transport, speed limits also applies to rail transport.

Description 
Currently the road speed limits in Thailand are as follows:

The exception can be made by putting a speed limit sign (a white circle with a limit on the centre, bordered with red stripe) or a city limit (an amber board as shown on the right) sign, telling a driver to reduce the speed as appropriate.

In addition to road vehicles, rail vehicles are also subject to the speed limits as follows. The exceptions can be made as a general notification of the State Railway of Thailand.

Following figures are the speed limits for an ordinary railway line and a switch respectively. All the numbers are in km/h.

History 
Since the introduction of the earliest law on road transport in 1934, a speed limit was set by the local government rather than the central government. The interior minister was empowered to set the ministerial rules or authorise the local governments to set their own speed limits. However, due to growing number of automobiles and discrepancies in the implementation, the original law was later amended and superseded in 1969. Instead of letting the local government to set speed limits, the central government took over the role. As part of the new law, speed limits were set, in 1969, as follows:-

 A typical small car weighing  or less:
  within Bangkok metropolitan area, Pattaya city and other municipalities (collectively called built-up area);
  outside the built-up areas.
  within the built-up areas;
  outside the built-up areas.
  within the built-up areas;
  outside the built-up areas.

12 years later, it was realised that  was too high and not energy efficient. Since 1992, transport minister was empowered to set the ministerial rules about speed limits on highways instead.

In 1999, speed limits for motorways was introduced.

There is also an idea of a point system, in which a driver who violates a highway code, especially speeding, receives demerit points as well as a ticket.

In 2015, state failed to switch urban speed limit from 80 km/h to 50 km/h. Since 2017, municipalities/province can set appropriate speed limit. In September 2018, half of the 76 provinces have urban speed limit not exceeding 50 km/h.

See also 
 Road signs in Thailand
 Speed limit
 Speed limits by country

References 

S
T